Māris Riekstiņš (born 8 April 1963 in Riga, Soviet Union) is a Latvian politician and diplomat and a former Foreign Minister of Latvia (November 2007 – April 2010). He is the current Ambassador of Latvia to the Russian Federation.

Biography

Riekstiņš' career in the Ministry of Foreign Affairs of Latvia began in 1992 as a Desk Officer of the Political Department of the Europe Division, followed by the position of the Director of the Western Europe Division. In 1993, he became the Under-secretary of State, soon assuming the duties of the State Secretary of the Ministry of Foreign Affairs. He remained in that position until his posting as the Ambassador of Latvia to the United States in 2004, and additionally non-resident Ambassador to Mexico. For most of 2007 Riekstiņš was Chief of Staff to the Prime Minister of Latvia Aigars Kalvītis. In November 2007 Riekstiņš was elected to the post of the Minister of Foreign Affairs of Latvia and held this position until April 2010, when his party stepped out of the government. In February, 2011 Ambassador Riekstiņš commenced his duties as the Permanent Representative of Latvia to NATO in Brussels.

In his career Riekstiņš has also been Head of the Latvian Delegation for Accession to NATO, Chairman of the Advisory Council for Latvia's membership of the World Trade Organization, Head of Delegation of Latvia in WTO talks in Seattle (1999), Doha (2000) and Cancun (2003). He has led the delegation for the U.S.-Baltic Partnership Charter and also been the Head of Latvian delegation for Estonian-Latvian sea border delimitation (agreement concluded in 1997 and ratified), as well as Lithuanian-Latvian sea border delimitation (agreement concluded in 1999, not ratified yet).

Riekstiņš has a law degree from the University of Latvia, preceded by graduation of the Faculty of Pedagogy of the Latvian Academy of Sport Education. He has two children.

Party affiliation and political career

In 2006 Riekstiņš joined the People's Party. He was a board member and presidential candidate in the 2007 Presidential election for the Party. He held the position of Foreign Minister in three coalition governments under the leadership of Prime Minister Aigars Kalvītis (People's Party), Prime Minister Ivars Godmanis (LPP/LC) and Prime Minister Valdis Dombrovskis (New Era). In the run up to the 10th Saeima election in October 2010 Riekstiņš was a candidate for the parliament of the Political Alliance "For a Good Latvia", consisting of the People's Party and LPP/LC. 8 members were returned to the Saeima from the alliance.

Education

 1987–1993	University of Latvia, Faculty of Law, lawyer, Master's Degree
 1981–1985	Latvian Academy of Sport Education, Faculty of Pedagogy, teacher, Master's Degree

Work experience

 February 2011 - 2015 Permanent Representative of the Republic of Latvia to NATO
 May 2010 -	Leading Scholar, Association "Sustainable Society Institute"
 November 2007 – April 2010	- Minister of Foreign Affairs of Latvia
 January 2007 – November 2007 - Chief of Staff to the Prime Minister of Latvia
 2006 - 2007 - Ambassador Extraordinary and Plenipotentiary of the Republic of Latvia to the United Mexican States (country of residence: USA)
 2004 - 2007 - Ambassador Extraordinary and Plenipotentiary of the Republic of Latvia to the United States of America
 1993 - 2004	- State Secretary of the Ministry of Foreign Affairs of the Republic of Latvia
 November 1992 -August 1993 - Under-secretary of State of the Ministry of Foreign Affairs of the Republic of Latvia
 March 1992 -November 1992 - Director of the Western Europe Division; Director of the Europe Division; Desk Officer of the Political Department of the Europe Division at the Ministry of Foreign Affairs of the Republic of Latvia
 1987–1992 - Deputy Chairman; Desk Officer of the Committee of Latvian Youth Organisations

Other related activities

 May 2009 - 	Chairman of the Counsellors' Convention, Latvian Academy of Sport Education
 2003 -        Deputy Chairman of the Council, Latvia Basketball Association
 June 2010 –November 2010  - Ambassador-at-Large, Ministry of Foreign Affairs of the Republic of Latvia
 2002–2004 - Head of the Latvian delegation for accession negotiations with the North Atlantic Treaty Organisation (NATO)
 January 2002 - July 2002 - Chairman of Supervisory Committee on Organisation of the NATO Aspirant Countries Summit in Riga on 5 and 6 July 2002
 1999–2004  - Chairman of the Advisory Council for the Membership of Latvia in the World Trade Organisation
 1997–1998	- Head of the Latvian delegation for the U.S.-Baltic Partnership Charter
 1998–2004	- Head of the Latvian-Italian Economic Working Group
 1996–2004	- Chairman of the Diplomatic Service Agency's Shareholders Council
 July 1996 - July 1999	- Head of the Latvian delegation for negotiations on Latvian-Lithuanian sea border delimitation
 October 1995 - July 1996 - Head of the Latvian delegation for negotiations on Latvian-Estonian sea border delimitation
 1995–2004	- Chairman of the Control Committee of Strategic Goods of Republic of Latvia
 2011–2015	- Member of the Chapter of Orders

Awards

Language skills

Riekstiņš is a native Latvian-speaker with proficiency in English, Russian and German.

External links
 Official webpage of the North Atlantic Treaty Organization http://www.nato.int
 Official webpage of the Ministry of Foreign Affairs of Latvia http://www.am.gov.lv
 Webpage of the Embassy of Latvia to the United States of America in Washington, DC http://www.latvia-usa.org
 Webpage of the People's Party of Latvia (available in Latvian) http://www.tautaspartija.lv

1963 births
Living people
Politicians from Riga
Ambassadors of Latvia to the United States
Ambassadors of Latvia to Mexico
Permanent Representatives of Latvia to NATO
Ministers of Foreign Affairs of Latvia
Recipients of the Cross of Recognition
Grand Officers of the Order of Merit of the Italian Republic
Recipients of the Order of the Cross of Terra Mariana, 3rd Class
Grand Officers of the Ordre national du Mérite
Officer's Crosses of the Order of the Lithuanian Grand Duke Gediminas
Recipients of the National Order of Merit (Malta)
University of Latvia alumni
Diplomats from Riga